The Fruitful Vine is a 1921 British silent drama film directed by Maurice Elvey and starring Basil Rathbone, Valia and Irene Rooke. From the silent era, probably the most notable thing about the film was an early appearance of British actor Rathbone, who was later to become famous for his portrayal of Sherlock Holmes. It is an adaptation of the 1911 novel The Fruitful Vine by Robert Hichens.

Cast
 Teddy Arundell as Francis Denzil
 Peter Dear as Theo Denzil
 Paulette del Baye as Princess Mancelli
 Mary Dibley as Edna Denzil
 Robert English as Sir Theodore Cannynge
 Basil Rathbone as Don Cesare Carelli
 Fred Raynham as Dr. Mervynn Ides
 Irene Rooke as Lady Sarah Ides
 Valia as Dolores Cannynge

References

Bibliography
 Goble, Alan. The Complete Index to Literary Sources in Film. Walter de Gruyter, 1999.

External links

1921 films
British drama films
British silent feature films
1921 drama films
1920s English-language films
Films directed by Maurice Elvey
British black-and-white films
Films based on British novels
Stoll Pictures films
1920s British films
Silent drama films